Anthony Bell (born 1970), sometimes known as Tony Bell, is an American animator, film director and screenwriter. After getting his start as a character layout artist and cleanup artist for The Simpsons in the early nineties, he got the opportunity to direct a number of episodes for the Nickelodeon hit, Rugrats. Most recently, he has directed four episodes for the Adult Swim animated television series The Boondocks, and directed the animated comedy-drama film, Alpha and Omega, along with Ben Gluck. The film earned a cult following, despite its mixed-to-negative reaction. Anthony returned to co-direct its sequel Alpha and Omega 2: A Howl-iday Adventure, after leaving the production of Norm of the North.

The Simpsons
Bell worked as a character layout artist for thirteen episodes of The Simpsons between 1990 and 1992, including "Bart's Friend Falls in Love", "Lisa's Pony", and "Bart the Daredevil". Before this, he worked as a cleanup artist on such episodes as "Krusty Gets Busted" and "Some Enchanted Evening".

Nickelodeon
Bell received his first directing gig for the television show Rugrats, contributing to an unspecified number of episodes. He directed the Rugrats TV movies Rugrats Vacation and  All Growed Up. Bell also directed the following episodes of The Wild Thornberrys:
"Valley Girls"
"Only Child"

Bell also directed the following episodes of As Told By Ginger:
"About Face"
"Mommie Nearest"
"Sibling Revile-ry"

Happily Ever After: Fairy Tales for Every Child
Bell directed 13 episodes for HBO's Happily Ever After: Fairy Tales for Every Child:
"The Three Little Pigs"
"Ali Baba and the Forty Thieves"
"The Bremen Town Musicians"
"The Empress' Nightingale"
"The Happy Prince"
"Henny Penny"
"The Frog Princess"
"The Princess and the Pauper"
"Rip Van Winkle (aka Rip & Vanna Winkle)"
"The Snow Queen"
"The Steadfast Tin Soldier"
"Robinita Hood"
"Aesop's Fables"

The Boondocks
Bell has directed four episodes of Adult Swim's The Boondocks. He has not directed any of the second season's episodes and it is unclear as to whether or not he will continue to contribute to the series. His credits, so far, include:
"The Garden Party"
"The Trial of R. Kelly"
"Guess Hoe's Coming to Dinner"
"The Real"

References

External links
 

American television directors
American animated film directors
Living people
1973 births